Associazione Bancaria Italiana is the trade association of Italian banks. The association was founded in 1919, few years after the Association of Italian Saving Banks (ACRI, founded 1912), the Association of Italian Rural Credit Unions (Cassa Rurale ed Artigiana, founded 1915) and more than 40 years after the Association of Popular Banks of Italy (Banca Popolare, founded 1876).

Chairmen
 Maurizio Sella (Banca Sella)
 Giuseppe Mussari (Banca Monte dei Paschi di Siena, ?–2013)
 Antonio Patuelli (Cassa di Risparmio di Ravenna, 2013–)

References

External links

 

Banking in Italy
Business organisations based in Italy
Organizations established in 1919
1919 establishments in Italy